Stretton Lower Hall is in the parish of Stretton in Cheshire, England.  It was built in 1660, on a site that was originally moated.  The house is constructed in brick with a slate roof and a sandstone cellar.  It has three storeys plus a cellar, with a symmetrical front containing shaped gables.  There are dentil bands of brick between the storeys.  The house is recorded in the National Heritage List for England as a designated Grade II listed building.

See also

Listed buildings in Stretton, Cheshire West and Chester
Stretton Hall, Cheshire
Stretton Old Hall

References

Country houses in Cheshire
Houses completed in 1660
Grade II listed buildings in Cheshire
Grade II listed houses
1660 establishments in England